Sawashfan (died 8th-century) was the ruler of the Afrighid dynasty of Khwarezm during the 8th century. He was the son and successor of Askajamuk II.

He is one of the few Afrighid rulers whose coins have been identified. The coin shows a bust of Sawashfan to the left, while it shows him on horseback to the right. Sawashfan is known in Chinese sources as Shao-she-fien, where he in 751 is reportedly said to have requested help from the Tang dynasty. Sawashfan was later succeeded by his grandson Azkajwar-Abdallah.

References
 
 

8th-century deaths
Year of birth unknown
8th-century Iranian people
Afrighids
Zoroastrian rulers